Julian García Schwarzer (born 26 October 1999) is a professional footballer who plays as a goalkeeper for Malaysia Super League club Kuching City and the Philippines national team.

Personal life
Schwarzer was born in Harrogate, England to an Australian father of German descent and a Filipino mother of Spanish descent. His father Mark Schwarzer, is a former professional footballer who played for clubs including  Middlesbrough, Fulham, Chelsea and Leicester City and represented Australia at international level. His mother, Paloma García, is a Filipina who migrated with her family to Australia. Paloma is the daughter of Arturo García, who was a former footballer and played for De La Salle University in Manila. She is also the grandniece of Albert M.G. García, who was a former national team player for the Philippines in the 1960s.

Club career

Fulham
In 2016, Schwarzer signed a two-year scholarship deal with Fulham and joined the U18 squad. In his first season with the U18 team, he failed to make a single appearance. He made his debut for Fulham U18 the next season in a 2–2 draw against Norwich City U18.

In February 2018, Schwarzer was called-up to the first team as the third goalkeeper in their match against Bolton Wanderers in the EFL Championship.

Schwarzer was released in the summer of 2018 after failing to secure a new contract.

Germany
A couple of months later, Schwarzer went overseas and joined Regionalliga Bayern club Pipinsried.

English non-league
After as short stint in Germany, Schwarzer returned to England and signed for non-league club Harlow Town for a short-term deal.

Schwarzer then joined National League South club Slough Town in the early part of the 2019–20 season.

In October 2019, Schwarzer joined Isthmian League club Chipstead. He made his debut for the club in a 1–1 draw against Tooting & Mitcham United in the Alan Turvey Trophy.

In February 2020, Schwarzer joined Southern Football League club Harrow Borough.

In August 2020, Schwarzer signed a short-term deal with Isthmian League club Basingstoke Town.

Return to Fulham
Schwarzer re-signed for Fulham as a backup goalkeeper for the U23 squad, sitting on the bench for several of their league matches. In May 2022, Schwarzer was once again, released by the club.

In March 2022, Schwarzer was sent out on loan to Kingstonian until the end of the 2021–22 season.

Azkals Development Team
Schwarzer joined Philippines Football League club Azkals Development Team. He made his debut for ADT in a 0–1 defeat against Kaya F.C.–Iloilo.

International career
Schwarzer is eligible to represent Australia, England, Germany, Philippines and Spain at international level due to his parent's heritage and his country of birth.

Schwarzer has been in contact with the Philippine Football Federation since 2019. He was initially eyed to play for the U23 national team in the 2019 and 2021 Southeast Asian Games but failing to secure a Philippine passport prevented him from suiting up.

He made his debut for the Philippines in a 4–1 friendly win against Timor Leste in Bali, Indonesia. He came in as a second half substitute replacing Anthony Pinthus in the 46th minute.

References

External links

 Julian Schwarzer at worldfootball.net

1999 births
Living people
Filipino footballers
Philippines international footballers
English footballers
Filipino people of Australian descent
Filipino people of German descent
Filipino people of Spanish descent
English people of Filipino descent
English people of Australian descent
English people of German descent
English people of Spanish descent
Citizens of the Philippines through descent
Association football goalkeepers
Philippines Football League players